Lars Thorbjørn Monsen (born 21 April 1963) is a Norwegian adventurer and journalist. He has done a number of exploration and backpacking expeditions in harsh wilderness.

He became well-known after documenting a thru-hiking trip made over the course of nearly three years in northern Canada, which was then broadcast on NRK in 2005. In 2010 and again in 2012, Monsen was the expedition leader for the Norwegian television program Ingen Grenser, a remake of BBC's Beyond Boundaries. In the first season, the group traversed 500 kilometers of the Cap of the North in 30 days, some of the participants with severe physical limitations.

Monsen is of Sami descent. He is married to American-Norwegian artist Trine Rein.

Television

References

External links 
 

1963 births
Living people
Explorers from Oslo
Norwegian Sámi people
Survivalists
Norwegian dog mushers
Norwegian television personalities